Hellboy is a 2004 American superhero film based on the Dark Horse Comics character of the same name, created by Mike Mignola. Directed and written by Guillermo del Toro, it is the first installment in the franchise’s live-action film series; the film stars Ron Perlman in the title role, alongside Selma Blair, Jeffrey Tambor, Karel Roden, Rupert Evans, and John Hurt. The film draws inspiration from the debut comic Hellboy: Seed of Destruction. In the film, a charismatic demon-turned-investigator named "Hellboy" works with the secretive Bureau of Paranormal Research and Defense to suppress paranormal threats, but a resurrected sorcerer seeks to make Hellboy fulfill his destiny by triggering the apocalypse.

Hellboy had its premiere at the Mann Village Theater in Los Angeles on March 30, 2004, and was released in the United States on April 2, by Sony Pictures Releasing. The film received generally positive reviews from critics and grossed over $99 million against a production budget between $60–66 million.

The film was followed by a sequel, Hellboy II: The Golden Army, released in 2008 by Universal Pictures, and a reboot of the same name, released in 2019 by Lionsgate.

Plot
In 1944, with the help of Russian mystic Grigori Rasputin, the Nazis build a dimensional portal off the coast of Scotland and intend to free the Ogdru Jahad to aid them in defeating the Allies. Rasputin opens the portal with the aid of his disciples, Ilsa von Haupstein and Obersturmbannführer Karl Ruprecht Kroenen. An Allied team destroys the portal, guided by a young scientist named Trevor Bruttenholm (colloquially known as "Broom"). The German team is killed and the portal is destroyed, in the process absorbing Rasputin, while Haupstein and Kroenen escape. The Allied team discovers that an infant demon with a right hand of stone has come through the portal; they dub him "Hellboy" and Bruttenholm adopts him.

Sixty years later, the eternally youthful Kroenen and Haupstein resurrect Rasputin. FBI agent John Myers is transferred to the Bureau for Paranormal Research and Defense (BPRD) at the request of Bruttenholm, where he meets the adult Hellboy and a psychic, amphibious humanoid named Abe Sapien. Hellboy is sent to investigate an incident at a museum and battles a creature named Samael. After defeating it, Hellboy visits former BPRD member Liz Sherman at a mental hospital that she committed herself to due to her unstable pyrokinetic abilities. Abe learns that Samael was resurrected by Rasputin, who has imbued Samael with the power to reincarnate and split his essence, causing two of the creature's eggs to hatch and mature each time one dies. Abe also learns that Bruttenholm is dying.

Concluding the eggs are in the sewer, Hellboy, Abe and several FBI agents go down to destroy them. Abe is injured while looking for the eggs, while Kroenen kills most of the agents. Kroenen, whose mutilated body is run by mechanical parts, shuts himself down, pretending to be defeated, and is brought to the bureau. FBI Director Tom Manning is angered by Hellboy's recklessness. Myers takes Liz out for coffee and to talk. Hellboy, jealous, covertly follows them, leaving the bureau unguarded. Kroenen reanimates himself and Rasputin appears at the bureau, confronting Bruttenholm. Rasputin offers him a vision of the future, showing Hellboy is the agent that will destroy the world. However, Bruttenholm tells Rasputin he will always see Hellboy as his son. Rasputin, respecting Bruttenholm for raising Hellboy, directs a quick execution by Kroenen. Bruttenholm dies holding a rosary.

Manning takes over the BPRD and locates Rasputin's mausoleum in an old cemetery outside Moscow, Russia. A team led by Manning and Hellboy enters the mausoleum, but swiftly becomes separated. Hellboy and Manning find their way to Kroenen's lair and kill him. Hellboy reunites with Liz and Myers at Samael's new nest, but the creatures overwhelm them. Liz uses her pyrokinetic powers to incinerate the creatures and their eggs. Hellboy, Liz and Myers lose consciousness and are captured by Rasputin and Haupstein. Rasputin sucks Liz's soul out of her body, then tells Hellboy to release the Ogdru Jahad in return for her soul. Hellboy awakens his true power as Anung un Rama, causing his horns to regrow and a fiery crown to appear between them. He begins to release the Ogdru Jahad. Myers breaks out of his restraints, subdues Haupstein, and reminds Hellboy that he can defy his destiny, throwing him Bruttenholm's rosary. Remembering his true self and what Bruttenholm brought him up to be, Hellboy breaks off his horns, reseals the Ogdru Jahad and defeats Rasputin by stabbing him with one of his broken-off horns.

However, Rasputin has been possessed by the Behemoth, a spawn of the Ogdru Jahad which bursts out of his body, grows to enormous size, and destroys him and Haupstein. Hellboy allows himself to be swallowed by the beast, then detonates a belt of hand grenades and destroys it from the inside. He whispers something in Liz's ear and she is revived. When she asks how her soul was returned, Hellboy replies that he said "Hey, you on the other side, let her go, because for... for her I'll cross over, and then you'll be sorry." Liz and Hellboy share a kiss.

Cast

Production

Del Toro and Hellboy creator Mike Mignola envisioned the film as a Ray Harryhausen film. The film was shopped and rejected by various studios for years due to studios disliking the title, script, and the fact that Perlman was cast as Hellboy.  Del Toro invited Harryhausen to teach the film's animators what made his effects techniques unique but declined, feeling that modern films were too violent.

Writing
The film is loosely based on the debut comic Hellboy: Seed of Destruction. While writing the script, Del Toro researched occult Nazi philosophies and used them as a reference for the film's opening scene. In an early version of the script, the gyroscope portal was described being made out of rails that formed into pentagrams, hexagrams, and inverted stars to illustrate the film's magic and occult elements. Del Toro chose to alter the origin from the comic to give main characters interconnected origins.

Labyrinths became a motif for the film to represent Hellboy's conflict of "choosing the right path." This was reflected in the film's opening titles. Del Toro felt that labyrinths represent the film's themes regarding "choices and taking different turns and choosing different destinies," Del Toro stated, "A labyrinth, it is said, is not a place to be lost, but a place to find yourself." Del Toro chose to add context to the BPRD logo by rooting the film's version in Catholic mythology by adding archangels in Broom's office. Del Toro wrote Hellboy's dialogue with Perlman in mind for the role, prior to casting him. Del Toro noted that he tried to emulate Jack Kirby and Harryhausen's action style for the film's action scenes.

Hellboy's gun was given the name "Samaritan" for the film to illustrate the BPRD's techno-magic. Del Toro approached the love story with a reverse Beauty and the Beast approach, stating, "I wanted the beauty to turn into a beast in the end to fully assume her mortal gifts... and when she accepts herself for what she is, a monster, then she can love the monster [Hellboy]." The idea of Hellboy spying on Liz and Myers was originally written for a separate script titled Meat Market, A Love Story. While Broom's death happened early in the comics, Del Toro wished to delay it to have audiences become attached to the character and "make it painful to lose that character."

Pre-production
Aside from working with Perlman before, Del Toro chose him for the title role because he felt Perlman could deliver subtlety and nuance with makeup. Vin Diesel was linked to the role when the film was being proposed at Universal Pictures, and Jeremy Renner was offered the "title role" but turned it down due to having no attachment to the source material. Del Toro assigned his real life friend, Santiago Segura, to play the train driver who assaults Hellboy. David Hyde Pierce was hired to provide the voice for Abe Sapien due to Pierce being a "bigger name" and having a "more recognizable sound". Pierce refused to take credit, perform press tours, or attend the premiere out of respect for Doug Jones.

Filming
The film was shot 6 days a week for 130 days, Mondays through Saturdays without a second unit. Sundays were reserved for editing. Del Toro noted that the film could have commenced filming in 1998, however, the film had difficulty finding a committed studio due to the stigma Hollywood associated superhero and comic book films with, at the time. The action scenes were staged after Harryhausen films with little to no camera movement using wide shots. The cemetery sequence was filmed in a real cemetery in Prague.

Soundtrack
Hellboys film score was composed by Marco Beltrami.

Release

Theatrical

Hellboy had its world premiere at the Mann Village Theater in Westwood, Los Angeles, California on March 30, 2004, and subsequently opened in wide release on April 2, where it grossed USD $23.1 million in 3,028 theaters on its opening weekend. It went on to gross $59.7 million in North America and $40.2 million in the rest of the world for a worldwide total of $99.8 million against a budget of  $66 million. Mike Mignola, the original creator of the Hellboy character, has stated that he was "very happy" with the Hellboy films. Some theaters refused to host the film due to the word "hell" being used in the title. Certain theaters in the South retitled the film in publicity materials, and on my heated marquees, as "Helloboy" to avoid comparisons with The Passion of the Christ, which was also in release at the time. The film was mysteriously dropped from certain theaters during easter, despite still playing nationwide. Certain toy chains also refused to carry the film's products due to the word "hell" in the title. Del Toro noted that one scene near the climax, which occurs after a rock hits the screen, was carelessly removed by projectionists in American theaters. He deduced that projectionists believed the reel had ended.

Home media
 
Hellboy was released on DVD in a two-disc special edition DVD on July 27, 2004, less than sixteen weeks after it opened in theaters. Included, were video introductions by Del Toro and Selma Blair, plus a feature that allowed viewers to click during selected parts of the film to comics drawn by Mike Mignola. Other bonus features include two audio commentaries, one by Del Toro and Mignola; and the other by Ron Perlman, Selma Blair, Jeffrey Tambor, and Rupert Evans, which was recorded on April 12, 2004. The special features also include visits to the "Right Hand of Doom" set and a two-hour documentary. This DVD topped the Nielsen VideoScan's First Alert DVD sales chart and the Video Store magazine's list of top rentals for the week ending August 1, 2004, registering a total of more than a half-million units in sales.

A three-disc unrated director's cut DVD set was released on October 19, 2004. In addition to all of the features of the original two-disc set, with the exception of a new director's commentary replacing the old one, new features included Del Toro introducing 20 minutes of additional and extended scenes, a composer commentary with isolated score replacing the cast commentary, a Cast Video Commentary with Perlman, Blair, Tambor and Rupert Evans, multiple production workshop featurettes, a Comic Con 2002 Panel Discussion with Del Toro, Perlman and Mignola, and A Quick Guide to Understanding Comics with Scott McCloud.

A high-definition Blu-ray version of the director's cut was released on June 5, 2007. It contains most of the same content as the DVD set, but is missing a few features such as the video commentary and the composer commentary. An Ultra HD Blu-ray version was released on October 15, 2019, with many of the remaining bonus features from the 3-disc reinstated and both cuts remastered in 4K resolution.

Reception

Critical response

The site's critical consensus reads, "With wit, humor and Guillermo del Toro's fantastic visuals, the entertaining Hellboy transcends the derivative nature of the genre." Metacritic assigned the film a weighted average score of 72 out of 100, based on 37 critics, indicating "generally favorable reviews". Audiences surveyed by CinemaScore gave the film a grade "B−" on scale of A to F.

Entertainment Weekly gave the film a "B" rating and wrote, "Pop pretensions can't undo a basic contradiction: that our hero is fighting metaphysical evil with pure, meaty brawn. Hellboy is engaging, but it's got a lot more boy in it than hell". In his review for The New York Times, Elvis Mitchell wrote, "Mr. del Toro avidly lavishes this texture on Hellboy ... giving it a kiss of distinction. It's an elegant haunted house of a picture with dread and yearning part of the eeriness". Roger Ebert gave the film three and half stars out of four and praised Ron Perlman's performance: "And in Ron Perlman, it has found an actor who is not just playing a superhero, but enjoying it ... he chomps his cigar, twitches his tail and battles his demons with something approaching glee. You can see an actor in the process of making an impossible character really work".  The film also received good reviews in the British press – for example, Peter Bradshaw from The Guardian commented amusedly on the unhistoricity of the Nazis invading Britain in the initial sequence but overall called the film "bizarre and loopy, romantic and dynamic". Claudia Puig USA Today was less enthusiastic and wrote, "Hellboys special effects don't offer much of anything new, its far-fetched plot leaves a bit to be desired, and there is plenty that flat-out doesn't make sense. Those unfamiliar with the comic book may leave the theater bedeviled and scratching their heads".

In 2022, Rolling Stone and Variety named the film amongst one of the best superhero films of all times.

Accolades
 
Hellboy was nominated for four Saturn Awards in 2005, including Best Fantasy Film, Best Special Edition DVD Release, and Best Make-Up, which it won. The film was also nominated for a Visual Effects Society Award in the category of "Outstanding Performance by an Animated Character in a Live Action Motion Picture." In 2007, Rotten Tomatoes declared Hellboy to be the 13th best-reviewed comic book film adaptation, out of 94 total.
In 2008, Empire magazine ranked Hellboy 11th in their list of "The 20 Greatest Comic Book Movies".

See also
 List of films featuring eclipses

References

Sources

External links 

 
 
 
 

2004 science fiction action films
2004 fantasy films
2000s superhero films
American superhero films
2004 films
American fantasy action films
Apocalyptic films
Columbia Pictures films
Dark Horse Entertainment films
Demons in film
Films scored by Marco Beltrami
Films directed by Guillermo del Toro
Films set in 1944
Films set in 2004
Films set in Moldova
Films set in New Jersey
Films set in psychiatric hospitals
Films set in Russia
Films set in Scotland
Films shot in the Czech Republic
Films produced by Lawrence Gordon
American monster movies
2000s monster movies
Films about parallel universes
Revolution Studios films
Live-action films based on comics
Films with screenplays by Guillermo del Toro
Cultural depictions of Grigori Rasputin
Films about Nazis
Films about the Federal Bureau of Investigation
Nazi zombie films
Hellboy films
Steampunk films
2000s English-language films
2000s American films